These are the programs that have been shown in MTV & VH1 in South-east Asia. Some of the programs listed were shown on different MTV & VH1 stations, particularly on MTV Philippines, MTV Pinoy, MTVph, MTV Indonesia, MTV Thailand, MTV India, MTV Pakistan, MTV Korea, MTV Japan, VH1 Indonesia, and VH1 Philippines.

0–9
 100% Pinoy
 4Minute's Friend Day - only on MTV Korea
 5 Things You Need to Know About...
 5taku Mansion - only on MTV Korea
 The 70's House
 2020 Code
 8th & Ocean
 16 and Pregnant
 16 and Recovering
 90s House

A
 A Double Shot at Love
 A Shot At Love With Tila Tequila
 Adult Contemporary Definitive Chart (AC/DC) - only on MTV South East Asia
 Advance Warning
 Adventures in Hollywood
 Aeon Flux
 After Hours - only on MTV Philippines
 After School Rocks - only on MTV South East Asia
 Alay - only on MTV Indonesia
 All Things Rock - only on MTV Philippines
 Alternative China - only on MTV China
 Amazingness
 America's Best Dance Crew
 Ampuh Compilation Hits - only on MTV Indonesia
 Ampuh est. 1996 - only on MTV Indonesia
 Ampuh it's the Show - only on MTV Indonesia
 Ampuh Nokia Stairway To Show - only on MTV Indonesia
 Ampuh Review - only on MTV Indonesia
 After Skool Rocks - only on MTV South East Asia
 Afterschool Alone - only on MTV South East Asia
 Afterschool Anthems - only on MTV South East Asia
 Afternoon Anthems - only on MTV South East Asia
 Alternative Countdown - only on MTV South East Asia
 Alternative Nation
 Are You the One?
 Are You the One? Second Chances
 Artist Of The Month - only on MTV China
 Artists Special - only on MTV South East Asia
 Asia Rocks - only on MTV South East Asia
 Asian Hits - only on MTV South East Asia
 Asian Takeaway - only on MTV South East Asia
 Audrina
 Awkward

B
 B+ Diary - only on MTV Korea
 BackTrack
 Balcony Stories XL - only on MTV South East Asia
 Bam's Unholy Union
 Banger Vibes - only on MTV South East Asia
 Barrio 19 - only on MTV Korea
 Battle for Ozzfest
 Beats MTV - only on MTV South East Asia
 Be Seen @ MTV - only on MTV Philippines
 Beauty School Cop Outs
 Beavis and Butthead
 Becoming
 Being Terry Kennedy
 Bellator MMA - only on MTV South East Asia, relay from Paramount Channel
 Big Bang - only on MTV Korea
 Big Tips Texas
 BIJK pop - only on MTV Indonesia; on ANTV
 Blue Mountain State
 Boiling Points
 Boiling Points (Malaysian edition)
 Breaking From Above
 Bromance
 Brothers Green: Eats!
 Bugging Out
 Bujang - only on MTV Indonesia
 Bullied
 Burned
 Bustamove
 Busted

C
 Caged
 Car Crash Couples
 Canto Hits - only on MTV China
 Canton Chart - only on MTV China
 Call to Greatness
 Celeb Ex In The City
 Celebrity Bites
 Celebrity Deathmatch
 Celebrity Ex On The Beach
 Celebrity Rap Superstar
 Chart Attack
 Cheyenne
 Chito Chat - only on MTV South East Asia
 Class Up - only on MTV Korea
 Chelsea Settles
 China Block - only on MTV South East Asia
 Channel Fiestar - only on MTV Korea
 Classic MTV
 Classics on Harley - only on MTV South East Asia
 Clickbait
 Colt 45 Rockista - only on MTV Philippines
 Comeback Show Top 10 - only on MTV Korea
 Countdown Express - only on MTV Korea
 Crank Yankers
 Crash Canyon
 Crash Karaoke
 Crispy News

D
 Đại Sứ Ước Mơ - only on MTV Vietnam
 Dalshabet's Cool Friends - only on MTV Korea
 Daddy's Girl
 DanceLife
 Dare To Live
 Daria
 Date N Style - only on MTV Indonesia
 Degrassi
 Deliciousness
 Diary with... - only on MTV Korea
 Disaster Date
 Dismissed
 D-Tour
 Do It - only on MTV Indonesia
 Double Trouble
 Dr. Bunny's MV White Paper - only on MTV Korea
 Drama Queen - only on MTV Indonesia
 Dream Station - only on MTV Korea
 Dustin Hits MTV - only on MTV Vietnam

E
 EDM Hits - only on MTV China
 EDM Countdown - only on MTV South East Asia
 Essential VH1 - only on MTV Philippines
 Ex On The Beach: Body SOS
 Ex on the Beach UK
 Exiled
 Extreme Cribs

F
 The Fabulous Life (VH1)
 Faking the Video
 Families Of The Mafia
 Famous Face - only on MTV Korea
 Favourite Top 10 - only on MTV Indonesia
 Fear Factor
 Final Fu
 Finding Carter
 Fired By Mom & Dad
 Fist Of Zen
 Flash Prank
 Flipped
 Flipside - only in MTV South East Asia
 Floribama Shore
 Footballer's Cribs
 For You in Full Blossom - only on MTV Korea
 Fraternity Life
 Friday Night Music
 Friendzone
 From G's To Gents

G
 Gaya Bebas - only on MTV Indonesia
 Game Changer
 Game Of Clones
 Geordie Shore
 Gerek Seh - only on MTV South East Asia & Indonesia
 Get Hitch'd
 Get Skool'd
 Get Spotted - only on MTV Philippines
 Getar Cinta
 Ghosted: Love Gone Missing
 Gimme 10 - only on MTV Philippines
 Girl Code
 Girls Meet Beauty - only on MTV Korea
 Girls on the Top - only on MTV Korea
 Global Room - only on MTV Indonesia
 Globally Dismissed
 Good Morning VH1 - only on VH1 India
 Gotik - only on MTV Indonesia
 Grind - only on MTV India
 The Groove - only in MTV South East Asia
 Grossbusters
 Guy Code

H
 Happy Tree Friends
 The Hard Times of RJ Berger
 High School Stories
 The Hills
 Hip-Hop Countdown
 Hip Up Boys -  only on MTV Korea
 Hollywood Heights
 Home Purchasing Club
 Homewrecker
 House of MTV -  only on MTV Philippines
 House of Food
 Human Giant

I
 I Bet You Will
 I Want a Famous Face
 I Used to Be Fat
 Iced Out - only on MTV Philippines
 ICONic - only on MTV South East Asia
 Idol Battle Cook - only on MTV South East Asia & MTV Korea
 Idol United - only on MTV Korea
 Inkigayo - only on MTV Korea
 If You Like, Try This - only on MTV South East Asia
 If You Really Knew Me
 I'm From Rolling Stone
 Inkigayo Magazine - only on MTV Korea
 Indo Klasik - only on MTV Indonesia
 Indonesia Super Bands - only on MTV Indonesia
 Insomnia - only on MTV Indonesia
 It's My Life

J
 Jamie Kenedy's Blowin Up
 Japan Hits - only on MTV South East Asia, MTV China & Taiwan
 Jackass
 Jersey Shore
 Jersey Shore: Family Vacation
 Jessica Simpson's The Price Of Beauty
 JK Hits - only on MTV South East Asia
 Just Tattoo Of Us

K
 Kamal Sutra - only on MTV South East Asia 
 Kitni Mast Hai Zindagi - only on MTV India & MTV Indonesia (2006)
 K-Pop Festival LIVE in Kumanoto 2013 - only on MTV Korea
 K-Pop Festival in Gangwon 2013 - only on MTV Korea
 K-Pop Hero - only on MTV Korea
 K-pop Star - only on MTV Korea
 K-Krush - only on MTV South East Asia
 K-Wave - only on MTV South East Asia
 K-Wave Karaoke - only on MTV South East Asia
 KARA's Meta Friends - only on MTV Korea
 Kountdown - only on MTV Korea

L
 Laguna Beach: The Real Orange County
 Late Night on MTV - only on MTV Pakistan
 Late Night Vibes - only on MTV South East Asia
 Law of the Jungle - only on MTV Korea
 Let Me Show - only on MTV Korea
 Life's a Beach - only on MTV South East Asia
 Life Of Ryan
 Live Wow Special - only on MTV Korea
 Lip Service
 Lokal Abbies - only on MTV Indonesia

M
 M Chat - only on MTV Japan
 M Size - only on MTV Japan
 Made 11
 Make it Beauty - only on MTV Korea
 Making The Band
 Making The Movie - only on MTV Korea
 Making The Musical - only on MTV Korea
 Making The Video
 Mando-Love - only on MTV South East Asia
 Massive - only on MTV Philippines
 Master In The House - only on MTV Korea and MTV South East Asia
 Match Up - only on MTV Korea
 Match Up: Block B Returns - only on MTV Korea
 Meet the Barkers
 Megadrive
 Midweek Madness - only on MTV Indonesia
 The Mission - only on MTV Indonesia
 Morning TV
 Morning Express - only on MTV South East Asia
 Moving In
 Music Expedition - only on MTV Korea
 Music Island - only on MTV Korea
 Musik Gue Pilihan Gue - only on MTV Indonesia
 MTV 1-2-3 (Indian chart show) - only on MTV India
 MTV 1-4-3 - only on MTV Philippines
 MTV 100% Indonesia
 MTV 4Minute - only on MTV Korea
 MTV81 - only on MTV South East Asia
 MTV A.M. - only on MTV Thailand
 MTV After Hours - only on MTV Japan
 MTV After School - only on MTV Thailand
 MTV Afternoon Tune - only on MTV Japan
 MTV Alternative Nation
 MTV Amplified - only on MTV South East Asia
 MTV Ampuh - only on MTV Indonesia
 MTV Arena - only on MTV Philippines
 MTV Asia Hitlist
 MTV Asian Delight - only on MTV Thailand
 MTV Ask
 MTV Awami - only on MTV Pakistan
 MTV B Live - only on MTV Thailand
 MTV B2ST - only on MTV Korea
 MTV Baap of Bakra - only on MTV India
 MTV Bangkok Jam - only on MTV Thailand
 MTV Barrio 19
 MTV Base - only on MTV Korea
 MTV Be Ready - only on MTV Thailand
 MTV Best.Show.Ever.
 MTV Big Chill - only on MTV South East Asia
 MTV Big Guns - only on MTV Pakistan
 MTV Big Picture - only on MTV India
 MTV Biorhythm
 MTV Bite Me - only on MTV South East Asia
 MTV Bling - only on MTV Philippines
 MTV Blog - only on MTV Thailand
 MTV Boom Top 10 - only on MTV South East Asia
 MTV Brand New
 MTV Breakfast Club - only on MTV Korea
 MTV Buzz - only on MTV Thailand
 MTV Bujang - only on MTV Indonesia
 MTV Celebrity Spin - only on MTV Philippines
 MTV Chart - only on MTV Thailand
 MTV Chillout - only on MTV Thailand
 MTV Chillout (India) - only on MTV India
 MTV Chinese Super 5 - only on MTV China & Taiwan
 MTV Classic
 MTV Classic Series - only on MTV Japan
 MTV Club - only on MTV South East Asia
 MTV Connect - only on MTV South East Asia
 MTV Cool Crap
 MTV Cupid Missed
 MTV The Cream - only on MTV Thailand
 MTV Cribs
 MTV Cribs: Footballers Stay Home
 MTV Cribs Collection
 MTV Cribs International
 MTV Cut 2 Cut - only on MTV India
 MTV Debut - only on MTV Thailand
 MTV Diary 
 MTV Diyes - only on MTV Philippines
 MTV European Top 20
 MTV Espresso - only on MTV Korea
 MTV Eye Candy - only on MTV Korea
 MTV Fanatic
 MTV Fashionista - only on MTV South East Asia
 MTV Fast Forward - only on MTV Thailand
 MTV Feel the Music - only on MTV South East Asia
 MTV Feel It - only on MTV South East Asia
 MTV Flashback - only on MTV South East Asia
 MTV Fresh - only on MTV South East Asia, Indonesia & MTV Japan
 MTV Front Row
 MTV Game Pad
 MTV The Games - only on MTV South East Asia
 MTV Get Spotted - only on MTV Philippines
 MTV Getar Cinta - only on MTV Indonesia
 MTV Girls' Generation - only on MTV Korea
 MTV GLAM - only on MTV Korea
 MTV Global Room - only on MTV Indonesia
 MTV Gokil - only on MTV Indonesia
 MTV Got Game - only on MTV South East Asia
 MTV Gotcha
 MTV Gress - only on MTV Indonesia
 MTV Grind
 MTV Halo-Halo - only on MTV Pinoy
 MTV Handpicked
 MTV Hanging Out
 MTV Harana  - only on MTV Philippines
 MTV Hip Hop - only on MTV South East Asia
 MTV Homecoming  - only on MTV Philippines
 MTV Hong Kong Roadshow - only on MTV South East Asia
 MTV Hoopla - only on MTV Philippines
 MTV Hot - only on MTV Indonesia
 MTV Hot Picks - only on MTV Japan
 MTV Housefull - only on MTV India
 MTV Icons - only on MTV South East Asia & Indonesia
 MTV In Control - only on MTV South East Asia
 MTV Insomnia - only on MTV Indonesia
 MTV Interactive - only on MTV South East Asia
 MTV International Top 40 Countdown - only on MTV Japan
 MTV Is Cool - only on MTV Pakistan
 MTV It's My Life - only on MTV South East Asia
 MTV Jams - only on MTV South East Asia & Indonesia
 MTV Jams Indonesia - only on MTV Indonesia
 MTV Jukebox - only on MTV Philippines
 MTV Jumpstart - only on MTV Philippines
 MTV Jus - only on MTV South East Asia & Malaysia
 MTV Kampus - only on MTV South East Asia
 MTV Kayozine - only on MTV South East Asia
 MTV Kickass Mornings - only on MTV India
 MTV Kopi - only on MTV South East Asia
 MTV Korea Top 5 - only on MTV Japan & Korea
 MTV KYA BAAT HAI - only on MTV India
 MTV Land - only on MTV South East Asia & Indonesia
 MTV Live and Loud
 MTV Live Wire
 MTV Loaded - only on MTV South East Asia
 MTV Lockdown Laughs
 MTV Lokal - only on MTV Philippines
 MTV Lokal Abiezz - only on MTV Indonesia
 MTV Lost in Translation - only on MTV India
 MTV Loveline - only on MTV Philippines
 MTV The M - only on MTV Korea
 MTV M-Pop
 MTV Made
 MTV Make Over - only on MTV Indonesia
 MTV Midweek Madness - only on MTV Indonesia
 MTV Mix - only on MTV Indonesia
 MTV Mobbed - only on MTV South East Asia
 MTV Monday Soundsation - only on MTV Indonesia
 MTV Morning TV - only on MTV South East Asia
 MTV Morning Greeting - only on MTV Indonesia
 MTV Morning Hot Picks - only on MTV Japan
 MTV Morning Show - only on MTV Indonesia
 MTV Morning Tune - only on MTV Japan
 MTV Most Wanted - only on MTV South East Asia
 MTV Most Wanted Indonesia - only on MTV Indonesia
 MTV MotoAlert
 MTV Movie Soundtrack - only on MTV Indonesia
 MTV Mush - only on MTV Philippines
 MTV Music Remedy - only on MTV South East Asia
 MTV Music Revolution - only on MTV South East Asia
 MTV Musik Banget - only on MTV Indonesia
 MTV Musika - only on MTV South East Asia
 MTV New - only on MTV Indonesia
 MTV News
 MTV Next Sound - only on MTV South East Asia
 MTV Nights
 MTV No Limits - only on MTV South East Asia
 MTV Non Stop Hits - only on MTV Indonesia
 MTV Now - only on MTV Vietnam
 MTV Now Streaming - only on MTV South East Asia
 MTV Nu-School - only on MTV South East Asia
 MTV Nusantara Hits - only on MTV South East Asia
 MTV Offroad - only on MTV Korea
 MTV On The Rock - only on MTV Thailand
 MTV The OPM Show - only on MTV Pinoy
 MTV Partyzone
 MTV PeeP - only on MTV Japan
 MTV Picks - only on MTV South East Asia
 MTV Pinoy Pop - only on MTV Pinoy
 MTV Playlist - only on MTV Pinoy
 MTV Pop 10 - only on MTV South East Asia
 MTV Pop 20 - only on MTV South East Asia
 MTV Pop Inc - only on MTV South East Asia
 MTV Powermix - only on MTV South East Asia
 MTV Presents
 MTV Presents:Bellator on Paramount Channel - only on MTV South East Asia
 MTV Quick Fix - only on MTV South East Asia
 MTV Reality Stars
 MTV Recommends - only on MTV South East Asia
 MTV Requested with Wiqar Ali Khan - only on MTV Pakistan
 MTV Reverb - only on MTV South East Asia
 MTV Riccanza World
 MTV Rock'd
 MTV Rock It
 MTV Rocks - only on MTV Pakistan & MTV South East Asia
 MTV Roadies - in India
 MTV Rumah Gue - only on MTV Indonesia
 MTV School Attack - only on MTV Korea
 MTV Screen - only on MTV China; co-host by VJ Chinese; relay from Channel 9
 MTV Sessions
 MTV Siesta - only on MTV Philippines
 MTV Slightly Off - only on MTV Pakistan
 MTV Sound Check - only on MTV India
 MTV Spankin' New - only on MTV South East Asia
 MTV Special - only on MTV South East Asia
 MTV Spinn - only on MTV Thailand
 MTV Sports
 MTV Splitsvilla - only on MTV India
 MTV Sunny Side - only on MTV Korea
 MTV Sunrise Tune - only on MTV Japan
 MTV Sunset Tune - only on MTV Japan
 MTV Supahstar - only on MTV Philippines
 MTV Super Select - only on MTV India
 MTV Style Check - only on MTV India
 MTV Swag - only on MTV South East Asia
 MTV Syok - only on MTV South East Asia
 MTV Tech Check - only on MTV India
 MTV Tell Me the Truth - only on MTV Korea
 MTV Thailand Hitlist - only on MTV Thailand
 MTV Thích Mê - only on MTV Vietnam
 MTV Top 10 with Wiqar - only on MTV Pakistan
 MTV Top 10 Favourite Videos
 MTV Top Choice - only on MTV Korea
 MTV Top 100 Hits of 2008
 MTV Top Hits - only on MTV Indonesia
 MTV Triple Play - only on MTV South East Asia
 MTV Twisted
 MTV U-Break - only on MTV Philippines
 MTV U Made - only on MTV Thailand
 MTV Ultrasound
 MTV Ultimate - only on MTV Korea
 MTV Upgraded
 MTV Urban Beats
 MTV Usil - only on MTV Indonesia
 MTV Vaults
 MTV Videosomnia
 MTV What The Hack - only on MTV India; co-hosted by VJ Jose & Ankit Fadia
 MTV Webbed - Kritika Kamra
 MTV Weekend - only on MTV Indonesia
 MTV Weekends
 MTV Whatever Things
 MTV Whats Up - only on MTV Indonesia
 MTV Wanna Be - only on MTV Pakistan
 MTV World Chart Express - only on MTV India & MTV Philippines
 MTV Wonder Girls - only on MTV Korea
 MTV Wow - only on MTV Indonesia
 MTV Zipper - only on MTV Indonesia
 Music Non-Stop
 My Big Fat Fabulous Wedding
 My Celeb MTV
 My Dream D8
 My MTV
 My Own
 My Super Sweet 16

N
 Newlyweds: Nick and Jessica
 Newport Harbor
 News Presents
 Ngedate-in Bonyok - only on MTV Indonesia
 Ngibul - only on MTV Indonesia
 Nitro Circus
 Noise From The Hood - only on MTV South East Asia
 Non Stop Hits Dangdut & Hindies - only on MTV Indonesia
 Non Stop Hits Lokal - only on MTV Indonesia
 Nongkrong Bareng - only on MTV Indonesia

O
 OG Hits - only on MTV South East Asia
 OG OK Karaoke - only on MTV South East Asia
 OK Karaoke - only on MTV South East Asia
 OK K-Wave Karaoke - only on MTV South East Asia
 OK Danceoke - only on MTV South East Asia & China
 Onboard @ MTV - only on MTV South East Asia
 One Bad Trip
 One More Time - only on MTV Korea
 OnlyOneOf: Unlocking Love - only on MTV Korea & MTV South East Asia
 The Osbournes

P
 Para Bos! - only on MTV Philippines
 Past Video Music Awards - only on MTV South East Asia
 Paris Hilton's Dubai BFF
 Paris Hilton's My New BFF
 The Playlist - only on MTV Philippines
 Pimp My Car - only on MTV Indonesia
 Pimp My Ride
 Pimp My Ride UK
 Pimp My Ride International
 Plain Jane
 Plan V Diary - only on MTV Korea
 Pop Style - only on MTV Indonesia
 PoP VS. Rock Weekend
 PoweR Girls
 Promposal
 Punk'd
 Pranked
 Pretty Little Liars
 Primetime Hits
 Push

R
 The Real World
 Retrosexual - only on MTV Korea
 Return Of The Boyband
 Revenge Prank
 Rex in the City
 Rich Girls
 Road Rules
 Rob & Big
 Robo Robo Popcorn - only on MTV Korea
 Rockola - only on MTV Philippines
 Roll Out - only on MTV Philippines
 Rookie King: Bangtan - only on MTV Korea
 Rookie King: UNVS - only on MTV Korea and MTV South East Asia
 Room 401
 Room Raiders
 Rouge
 Run's House
 Running Man - only on MTV Korea and MTV South East Asia

S
 Safeword
 Salam Dangdut
 Say What - only on MTV South East Asia
 SBS MTV Diary - only on MTV Korea
 SBS MTV K-Pop 20 - only on MTV Korea
 SBS MTV Pop 20 - only on MTV Korea
 SBS MTV The Show
 SBS MTV Sunny Side - only on MTV Korea
 Scandalicious
 Scarred
 School Attack - only on MTV Korea
 Score
 Scream Queens
 Scrubbing In
 Senseless
 Seoul Sunday
 Sex With Mom And Dad
 Shibuhara Girls
 Short Circuitz
 Shuga
 The Show: All New K-Pop - only on MTV Korea
 Siesta Key
 Singled Out
 Sing MTV - only on MTV South East Asia
 Single AF
 Skins
 Sleeping with the Family
 Slips
 Snack-Off
 Snooki & Jwoww
 Sorority Life
 South Park - only on VH1 India
 Speed Wild Story - only on MTV Korea
 SpongeBob SquarePants - only on MTV Korea
 Spring Break With Grandad
 The Secret Life of Suckers - only on MTV India.
 The Stage - only on MTV Korea
 The Stage: Big Pleasure - only on MTV Korea
 Star Beauty Show Season 2 - only on MTV Korea
 StarStalking - only on MTV Korea
 Strictly Confidential - only on MTV Pakistan
 Style Guru - only on MTV Pakistan
 Stylissimo - only on MTV South East Asia
 Subterranean - only on MTV Philippines
 Suka Suka Gue - only on MTV Indonesia
 Sunny Side Up - only on MTV South East Asia
 Supermodel 2017 - only on MTV South East Asia & MTV Korea
 Superock
 Super Show 4 in Seoul 3D - only on MTV Korea

T
 Ta-Dah! It's... - only on MTV Korea
 Taildaters
 Taking The Stage
 Taquita And Kaui
 Teen Cribs
 Teen Mom
 Teen Top's Wake Up - only on MTV Korea
 Tempura - only on MTV Japan
 Tamu Istimewa - only on MTV Indonesia
 Thần Tượng Đột Kích - only on MTV Vietnam
 Till Death Do Us Par
 That's Amore!
 The Adventures Of Chico And Guapo
 The Andy Milonakis Show
 The Ashlee Simpson Show
 The Assistant
 The Celebrity Agency
 The Challenge: Vendettas
 The Charlotte Show
 The City
 The Dudesons in America
 The Family Crews
 The Grind
 The Hard Times of RJ Berger
 The Hills
 The Hills : New Beginning
 The Inbetweeners
 The L.A. Complex
 The Lair
 The MTV Show
 The Osbournes
 The Pauly D Project
 The Shop
 The Asia Countdown - only on MTV South East Asia
 The Stage Big Pleasure 
 The Tom Green Show
 The Wade Robson Project
 The Valleys
 The X Effect
 There & Back
 Tiara Girls
 Ticket To VH1
 Time's Up
 Tong Hits - only on MTV Philippines
 Top Hits - only on MTV Indonesia
 Total Request - only on MTV Indonesia
 Total Request Live (TRL)
 TLC - only on MTV China
 Travel at Home - only on MTV Korea & MTV South East Asia
 Treasure Map - only on MTV Korea & MTV South East Asia
 Trendspotting - only on MTV South East Asia
 Trick it Out - only on MTV Philippines
 Trip To K-Pop - only on MTV Korea & MTV South East Asia
 Trippin'
 True Life
 True Life Crime

U
 UK Top 10 - only on MTV South East Asia
 Urban Hits - only on MTV China
 Urban Beats - only on MTV South East Asia & Indonesia
 Underemployed
 Urban Countdown - only on MTV South East Asia
 Usavich 

V
Valemont
 VH1 Absolute Divas - only on VH1 Indonesia
 VH1 After 2000 - only on VH1 Indonesia
 VH1 All Access
 VH1 Band It Like - only on VH1 Indonesia
 VH1 Behind The Music
 VH1 Best Mix - only on VH1 Indonesia
 VH1 Cardio Videos - only on VH1 India
 VH1 Dance 101 - only on VH1 India
 VH1 Dance Floor - only on VH1 Indonesia
 Vh1 Divas - only on VH1 India
 VH1 Down Tempo - only on VH1 Thailand
 VH1 Driven
 VH1 Famous Crime Scene
 VH1 Favorite - only on VH1 Indonesia
 VH1 From Flab to Fab
 VH1 Get With In - only on VH1 India
 VH1 Greatest Love Song - only on VH1 Indonesia
 VH1 Hip Hop Hustle - only on VH1 India
 VH1 Hit Factory - only on VH1 Thailand
 VH1 Hits
 VH1 Hogan Knows Best
 VH1 Left Centre - only on VH1 India
 VH1 Legendary Albums - only on VH1 Indonesia
 VH1 Love Is... - only on VH1 India
 VH1 Motormouth
 VH1 Movie Collector - only on VH1 Indonesia
 VH1 Playlist - only on VH1 India
 VH1 Rock - only on VH1 Indonesia
 VH1 Rock Rules - only on VH1 India
 VH1 SoulStage
 VH1 Sound of 80's 90's - only on VH1 Indonesia
 VH1 Time Machine - only on VH1 Indonesia
 VH1 Top 10 Classics - only on VH1 Indonesia
 VH1 Upbeat - only on VH1 Thailand
 VH1 Video Collection
 VH1 Zodiac - only on VH1 Indonesia
 Video Love
 Vidiots
 Viet Must - only on MTV Vietnam
 Viral Mix - only on MTV South East Asia
 Viva la Bam
 Viral Countdown - only on MTV South East Asia
 VJ Camp - only on MTV Vietnam
 Vomiting - only on VH1 Philippines

W
 The Wade Robson Project
 WakeBrothers
 Wake Up Call - only on MTV Indonesia
 Wake Up MTV! - only on MTV Japan
 Wanna Come In?
 Washington Heights
 We Heart Music Videos! - only on MTV South East Asia
 Weekend - only on MTV Indonesia
 Weekend Break - only on MTV Thailand
 What The Hack - only on MTV India; co-hosted by VJ Jose & Ankit Fadia
 Whats Up - only on MTV Indonesia
 When I Was 17
 Where My Dogs At?
 White Supremacy Destroyed My Life
 Why Can't I Be You?
 Wildboyz
 Wild N' Out
 Winter Break: Hunter Mountain
 Winning Show - only on MTV Korea
 Wiqar is MTV Style Guru - only on MTV Pakistan
 Wonder Boy - only on MTV Korea
 World Stage

Y
 Yo Momma
 YTN Starnews - only on MTV Korea
 Yo! MTV Raps Asia - only on MTV South East Asia
 Yo! Hip-Hop Hits - only on MTV South East Asia
 Young and Married

See also
 MTV Asia
 MTV Philippines
 MTV Pinoy
 MTV Indonesia
 MTV Thailand
 MTV India
 MTV Pakistan
 MTV Japan
 MTV Mandarin
 MTV Korea

References
 MTV Korea Schedule 
 MTV Thailand Schedule
 MTV Philippines Schedule
 MTV South East Asia Schedule
 MTV China
 MTV Indonesia Schedule
 MTV India Schedule
 MTV Pakistan Schedule Icon

Mtv Asia
MTV